The 2022 FIFA World Cup qualification UEFA Group A was one of the ten UEFA groups in the World Cup qualification tournament to decide which teams would qualify for the 2022 FIFA World Cup finals tournament in Qatar. Group A consisted of five teams: Azerbaijan, Luxembourg, Portugal, the Republic of Ireland and Serbia. The teams played against each other home-and-away in a round-robin format.

The group winners, Serbia, qualified directly for the World Cup finals, while the runners-up, Portugal, advanced to the second round (play-offs).

Qatar were partnered with the five-team Group A, which enabled the 2022 FIFA World Cup hosts to play centralised friendlies against these countries on their "spare" match dates. However, these friendlies did not count in the qualifying group standings. Qatar played their "home" matches in Europe in order to allow short travel times for their opponents.

Standings

Matches
The fixture list was confirmed by UEFA on 8 December 2020, the day following the draw. Times are CET/CEST, as listed by UEFA (local times, if different, are in parentheses).

Goalscorers

Discipline
A player was automatically suspended for the next match for the following offences:
 Receiving a red card (red card suspensions could be extended for serious offences)
 Receiving two yellow cards in two different matches (yellow card suspensions were carried forward to the play-offs, but not the finals or any other future international matches)
The following suspensions were served during the qualifying matches:

Notes

References

External links

Qualifiers – Europe, FIFA.com
European Qualifiers, UEFA.com

Group A
2020–21 in Azerbaijani football
2021–22 in Azerbaijani football
2020–21 in Luxembourgian football
2021–22 in Luxembourgian football
2020–21 in Portuguese football
2021–22 in Portuguese football
Portugal at the 2022 FIFA World Cup
2021 in Republic of Ireland association football
2020–21 in Serbian football
2021–22 in Serbian football
Serbia at the 2022 FIFA World Cup